Novokiyevka is a rural locality (a selo) in Novokiyevsky Selsoviet of Mazanovsky District, Amur Oblast, Russia. The population was 106 as of 2018. There are 17 streets.

Geography 
Novokiyevka is the satellite of Novokiyevsky Uval, 2 km north of Novokiyevsky Uval (the district's administrative centre) by road. Novokiyevsky Uval is the nearest rural locality.

References 

Rural localities in Mazanovsky District